Hooper is an unincorporated community in Whitman County, Washington, United States.

History
The community was named around 1883 for early settler Albert J. Hooper. As of 2007, the population of Hooper was about 21.

Geography
The community is located in the Palouse Region, which is known for its rolling hills and wheat production.

Hooper is located along the southern bank of the Palouse River, which serves as the boundary between Whitman County and Adams County. An old route of Washington State Route 26 crosses the river at Hooper, though the current alignment of the route is north of the river about a mile from Hooper. The Columbia Plateau Trail also passes within a mile of Hooper on the opposite side of the river.

References

Unincorporated communities in Washington (state)
Unincorporated communities in Whitman County, Washington
Company towns in Washington (state)